Håkan Svenneling (born 17 September 1985) is a Swedish politician.  he serves as Member of the Riksdag representing the constituency of Värmland County. He is affiliated with the Left Party.

He was re-elected as Member of the Riksdag in September 2018 and September 2022.

References 

Living people
1985 births
Place of birth missing (living people)
21st-century Swedish politicians
Members of the Riksdag 2014–2018
Members of the Riksdag 2018–2022
Members of the Riksdag 2022–2026
Members of the Riksdag from the Left Party (Sweden)